Eddie Woods (born 29 July 1951) is a Welsh former professional footballer. A striker, Woods joined Newport County in 1974 from Bristol City. Woods went on to make 151 appearances for the club, scoring 55 goals. In 1979, he joined Bridgend Town.

References

External links
 

Welsh footballers
Bristol City F.C. players
Scunthorpe United F.C. players
Newport County A.F.C. players
English Football League players
Living people
Ton Pentre F.C. players
Bridgend Town A.F.C. players
Association football forwards
1951 births